Coronado Chávez (1807–1881) was President of Honduras from 8 January 1845 to 1 January 1847. For the week prior to his taking office he had been a member of the council of ministers that was running Honduras along with Casto Alvarado.

He was twice appointed by Francisco Ferrera as Vice President of Honduras, 1841-1843 and 1847. He was Minister of Finance of Honduras in 1862.

References

1807 births
1881 deaths
Presidents of Honduras
Vice presidents of Honduras
Finance Ministers of Honduras
19th-century Honduran people